State of the Onion is a book written by Julie Hyzy and published by Berkley Books (owned by Penguin Group) on 2 January 2008, which later went on to win the Anthony Award for Best Paperback Original in 2009.

References 

Anthony Award-winning works
American mystery novels
2008 American novels